Alfred McMurray (4 November 1914 – 30 June 1988) was an Irish first-class cricketer.

McMurray was born at Belfast in November 1914, and was educated in the city at Ormeau Park School. He played one first-class cricket match for Ireland against Scotland at Dublin in 1939. He scored 5 runs in Ireland's first-innings, before being bowled by John Farquhar; in their second-innings he was dismissed by William Dippie for 4, with Scotland winning by 162 runs. Outside of cricket, McMurray worked as a joiner. He died at Belfast in June 1988.

References

External links

1914 births
1988 deaths
Cricketers from Belfast
Irish cricketers